Edel Hætta Eriksen (born 17 October 1921) is a Norwegian schoolteacher and politician.

Biography
She was born in Guovdageaidnu Kautokeino to Klemet Klemetsen Hætta and midwife Berit Karen Olsdatter Erke. She worked as schoolteacher from 1949 to 1969, and headmaster from 1969 to 1977. 

She was a board member of the Norwegian Sami Association 1968–1975, a member of the Saami Council from 1956 to 1963 and from 1974 to 1977, and a member of the Arts Council Norway. She was decorated Knight, First Class of the Order of St. Olav in 1988. She turned 100 in October 2021.

Selected works
Låkkangirj'ji sámi-ja dárogillii (2 volumes 1965/1970)
Muitalusat ja dáhpáhusat Guovdageainnus (4 volumes 1991–1997)

References

1921 births
Living people
People from Kautokeino
Norwegian centenarians
Norwegian schoolteachers
Norwegian Sámi politicians
Women centenarians